Chutes Park in Los Angeles, California began as a trolley park in 1887. It was a  amusement park bounded by Grand Avenue on the west, Main Street on the east, Washington Boulevard on the north and 21st Street on the south. At various times it included rides, animal exhibits, a theater and a baseball park. In 1910 the park was sold to new owners (including Frederick Ingersoll) and reopened as Luna Park. The amusement park closed in 1914.

The name Chutes Park was also applied to the baseball park which opened around 1900 and was the original home of the Los Angeles Angels of the Pacific Coast League.

History

It had previously been the site of a hotel. He also made a business arrangement to establish a horse-drawn rail line to connect to the city streetcar lines because the location was outside of the Los Angeles city limits. He began weekly variety shows in a small pavilion, brought in animals for display, and planted an orange grove. 

Unfortunately, the park was allowed to decline and by the late 1890s was seldom used. In 1899, however, the property was sold to new owners which created the Los Angeles County Improvement Co. They built a new theater, baseball park and brought in new rides.

The rides

The park featured such rides as a roller coaster, a chutes water slide that dropped riders in boats from a  tower into a manmade lake, and a miniature railroad. The park's merry-go-round was electrically powered, as was the engine that pulled the boats back up from the lake to the tower.

In October 1903, the operators added a steel-framed figure-eight roller coaster.

Attractions

The site also included, at various times, such exotic diversions as a seal pond, ostriches, House of Trouble, and Cave of the Winds. By 1901, it also had a 4,000-seat theater and a baseball park that seated 10,000.

The Los Angeles County Improvement Co. added a fishing pond, a small circus, hot-air balloon rides, the Catalina Marine Band, and a small railroad that followed the outer perimeter of the park.

The baseball park

By 1900, the baseball diamond was completed on the northern end of the park (Washington bordering the third base line), with a team to play in the new California League. It would be the first team to be called the Los Angeles Angels.  It was also home of the Vernon Tigers. Following games, a gate in the center field fence was opened and fans were allowed to enter the theme park.

The Chutes Park ballfield was also sometimes called Washington Park. It was replaced by what the newspapers termed a "new" Washington Park in 1911, which had been built just south and east of the old one, and overlaying both the old outfield and the former waterslide area. The new ballpark was expanded for the 1913 season, supplanting most if not all of the former amusement park. The Chutes / Washington area was abandoned entirely when the Angels moved to Wrigley Field at 42nd Street and Avalon Boulevard. The Chutes Park site is now occupied by the Metropolitan Courthouse of the Los Angeles County Superior Court, as well as commercial space and parking lots.

Sources
 Berman, Jay and Sesar Carreno.  "The Short Life of a Downtown Amusement Park," Los Angeles Downtown News,  9/4/2006
Stanton, Jeffrey. 2005. Chutes & Luna Park - 1900 - 1912. Retrieved 27 July 2007
Take Me Out to the Ball Park, Lowell Reidenbaugh, The Sporting News, 1983 & 1987, p. 138-142
Ballparks of North America, Michael Benson, McFarland, 1989, p. 209

References

External links
 
LAistory: Chutes Park - LAist.com
Chutes Park shown on Sanborn map, 1907

Defunct amusement parks in California
American football venues in Los Angeles
Baseball venues in Los Angeles
Los Angeles Angels (PCL) stadiums
Defunct minor league baseball venues
Demolished sports venues in California
Demolished buildings and structures in Los Angeles
History of Los Angeles
South Los Angeles
Sports venues in Los Angeles
USC Trojans football venues